Fishbrain is a mobile app and online platform for anglers that provides map-based tools, social networking features, fishing forecasts, fishing forecasts including weather, lunar cycles, tidal charts, map functionality, predicted fish activity, previous user-catches, analysis of species behavior and data-backed recommendations on fishing gear. Fishbrain is used by anglers to find new spots to fish and see exact catch locations on maps, which include depth information and user-generated tips and ratings. 

In 2019, Fishbrain added a marketplace where anglers can buy fishing gear. This marketplace is offered online and in-app and features gear recommendations based on real-world catch data. This allows anglers to see which gear is best for catching specific species, or for specific fishing tactics.

The platform has a user base of over 11 million users, allowing it to achieve access to a variety of data on species, migratory patterns, and more. Fishbrain has worked with governmental agencies to help identify endangered fish species and how climate is impacting behavioral patterns. The company has promotedsustainable fishing through promoting a catch-and-release approach, as well as encouraging users to clean up and care for their local waterways.

Fishbrain was created by Jens Persson and Johan Attby, and launched in 2010 as a free mobile app, and has expanded to include utility functions for recreational fishing with some of its features available with a subscription. The Fishbrain app is downloadable from the App Store and Google Play, and has been made available for iPhone, iPad, and Android devices.

References

External links
 

2010 software
Android (operating system) software
Internet properties established in 2010
IOS software
Photo software
Image-sharing websites
Swedish social networking websites
Mobile software
Proprietary cross-platform software
Swedish brands
Companies based in Stockholm
Software companies of Sweden
Angling